This page lists all described species of the spider family Hahniidae accepted by the World Spider Catalog :

A

Alistra

Alistra Thorell, 1894
 A. annulata Zhang, Li & Zheng, 2011 — China
 A. astrolomae (Hickman, 1948) — Australia (Tasmania)
 A. berlandi (Marples, 1955) — Samoa
 A. centralis (Forster, 1970) — New Zealand
 A. hamata Zhang, Li & Pham, 2013 — Vietnam
 A. hippocampa Zhang, Li & Zheng, 2011 — China
 A. inanga (Forster, 1970) — New Zealand
 A. longicauda Thorell, 1894 (type) — Indonesia (Sumatra)
 A. mangareia (Forster, 1970) — New Zealand
 A. mendanai Brignoli, 1986 — Solomon Is., Réunion
 A. myops (Simon, 1898) — Philippines
 A. napua (Forster, 1970) — New Zealand
 A. opina (Forster, 1970) — New Zealand
 A. personata Ledoux, 2004 — Réunion
 A. pusilla (Rainbow, 1920) — Australia (Lord Howe Is.)
 A. radleyi (Simon, 1898) — Sri Lanka
 A. reinga (Forster, 1970) — New Zealand
 A. stenura (Simon, 1898) — Sri Lanka
 A. sulawesensis Bosmans, 1992 — Indonesia (Sulawesi)
 A. taprobanica (Simon, 1898) — Sri Lanka
 A. tuna (Forster, 1970) — New Zealand

Amaloxenops

Amaloxenops Schiapelli & Gerschman, 1958
 A. palmarum (Schiapelli & Gerschman, 1958) — Argentina
 A. vianai Schiapelli & Gerschman, 1958 (type) — Argentina

Antistea

Antistea Simon, 1898
 A. brunnea (Emerton, 1909) — USA, Canada
 A. elegans (Blackwall, 1841) (type) — Europe, Turkey, Russia (Europe to South Siberia), Japan

Asiohahnia

Asiohahnia Ovtchinnikov, 1992
 A. alatavica Ovtchinnikov, 1992 (type) — Kazakhstan, Kyrgyzstan
 A. dzhungarica Ovtchinnikov, 1992 — Kazakhstan
 A. ketmenica Ovtchinnikov, 1992 — Kazakhstan
 A. liangdangensis (Tang, Yang & Kim, 1996) — China
 A. longipes Ovtchinnikov, 1992 — Kyrgyzstan
 A. reniformis (Chen, Yan & Yin, 2009) — China
 A. spinulata Ovtchinnikov, 1992 — Kyrgyzstan
 A. xinjiangensis (Wang & Liang, 1989) — China

Austrohahnia

Austrohahnia Mello-Leitão, 1942
 A. catleyi Rubio, Lo-Man-Hung & Iuri, 2014 — Argentina
 A. melloleitaoi (Schiapelli & Gerschman, 1942) — Argentina
 A. praestans Mello-Leitão, 1942 (type) — Argentina

C

Chorizomma

Chorizomma Simon, 1872
 C. subterraneum Simon, 1872 (type) — Spain, France

Cicurina

Cicurina Menge, 1871
 C. aenigma Gertsch, 1992 — USA
 C. alpicora Barrows, 1945 — USA
 C. anhuiensis Chen, 1986 — China
 C. arcata Chamberlin & Ivie, 1940 — USA
 C. arcuata Keyserling, 1887 — USA, Canada
 C. arizona Chamberlin & Ivie, 1940 — USA
 C. arkansa Gertsch, 1992 — USA
 C. armadillo Gertsch, 1992 — USA
 C. atomaria Simon, 1898 — USA
 C. avicularia Li, 2017 — China
 C. bandera Gertsch, 1992 — USA
 C. bandida Gertsch, 1992 — USA
 C. baronia Gertsch, 1992 — USA
 C. barri Gertsch, 1992 — USA
 C. blanco Gertsch, 1992 — USA
 C. breviaria Bishop & Crosby, 1926 — USA
 C. brevis (Emerton, 1890) — USA, Canada
 C. browni Gertsch, 1992 — USA
 C. brunsi Cokendolpher, 2004 — USA
 C. bryantae Exline, 1936 — USA
 C. bullis Cokendolpher, 2004 — USA
 C. buwata Chamberlin & Ivie, 1940 — USA
 C. caliga Cokendolpher & Reddell, 2001 — USA
 C. calyciforma Wang & Xu, 1989 — China
 C. cavealis Bishop & Crosby, 1926 — USA
 C. caverna Gertsch, 1992 — USA
 C. cicur (Fabricius, 1793) (type) — Europe to Central Asia
 C. coahuila Gertsch, 1971 — Mexico
 C. colorada Chamberlin & Ivie, 1940 — USA
 C. coryelli Gertsch, 1992 — USA
 C. damaoensis Li, 2017 — China
 C. davisi Exline, 1936 — USA
 C. daweishanensis Wang, Zhou & Peng, 2019 — China
 C. delrio Gertsch, 1992 — USA
 C. deserticola Chamberlin & Ivie, 1940 — USA
 C. dong Li, 2017 — China
 C. dorothea Gertsch, 1992 — USA
 C. eburnata Wang, 1994 — China
 C. ezelli Gertsch, 1992 — USA
 C. gertschi Exline, 1936 — USA
 C. gruta Gertsch, 1992 — USA
 C. harrietae Gertsch, 1992 — USA
 C. hexops Chamberlin & Ivie, 1940 — USA
 C. holsingeri Gertsch, 1992 — USA
 C. hoodensis Cokendolpher & Reddell, 2001 — USA
 C. hoshinonoana Shimojana & Ono, 2017 — Japan
 C. idahoana Chamberlin, 1919 — USA, Canada
 C. intermedia Chamberlin & Ivie, 1933 — USA
 C. itasca Chamberlin & Ivie, 1940 — USA
 C. iviei Gertsch, 1971 — Mexico
 C. japonica (Simon, 1886) — Korea, Japan. Introduced to Europe
 C. jiangyongensis Peng, Gong & Kim, 1996 — China
 C. jonesi Chamberlin & Ivie, 1940 — USA
 C. joya Gertsch, 1992 — USA
 C. kailiensis Li, 2017 — China
 C. kekei Wang, Zhou & Peng, 2019 — China
 C. kimyongkii Paik, 1970 — Korea
 C. leona Gertsch, 1992 — Mexico
 C. lichuanensis Wang, Zhou & Peng, 2019 — China
 C. ludoviciana Simon, 1898 — USA
 C. machete Gertsch, 1992 — USA
 C. maculifera Yaginuma, 1979 — Japan
 C. maculipes Saito, 1934 — Japan
 C. madla Gertsch, 1992 — USA
 C. majiangensis Li, 2017 — China
 C. marmorea Gertsch, 1992 — USA
 C. maya Gertsch, 1977 — Mexico
 C. mckenziei Gertsch, 1992 — USA
 C. medina Gertsch, 1992 — USA
 C. menardia Gertsch, 1992 — USA
 C. microps Chamberlin & Ivie, 1940 — USA
 C. mina Gertsch, 1971 — Mexico
 C. minima Chamberlin & Ivie, 1940 — USA
 C. minnesota Chamberlin & Ivie, 1940 — USA
 C. minorata (Gertsch & Davis, 1936) — USA
 C. mirifica Gertsch, 1992 — USA
 C. mixmaster Cokendolpher & Reddell, 2001 — USA
 C. modesta Gertsch, 1992 — USA
 C. neovespera Cokendolpher, 2004 — USA
 C. nervifera Yin, 2012 — China
 C. nevadensis Simon, 1886 — USA
 C. obscura Gertsch, 1992 — USA
 C. oklahoma Gertsch, 1992 — USA
 C. orellia Gertsch, 1992 — USA
 C. pablo Gertsch, 1992 — USA
 C. pacifica Chamberlin & Ivie, 1940 — USA
 C. pagosa Chamberlin & Ivie, 1940 — USA
 C. pallida Keyserling, 1887 — USA
 C. pampa Chamberlin & Ivie, 1940 — USA
 C. paphlagoniae Brignoli, 1978 — Turkey
 C. parallela Li, 2017 — China
 C. parma Chamberlin & Ivie, 1940 — USA
 C. pastura Gertsch, 1992 — USA
 C. patei Gertsch, 1992 — USA
 C. peckhami (Simon, 1898) — USA, Canada
 C. phaselus Paik, 1970 — Korea
 C. placida Banks, 1892 — USA
 C. platypus Cokendolpher, 2004 — USA
 C. porteri Gertsch, 1992 — USA
 C. puentecilla Gertsch, 1992 — USA
 C. pusilla (Simon, 1886) — USA
 C. rainesi Gertsch, 1992 — USA
 C. reclusa Gertsch, 1992 — USA
 C. riogrande Gertsch & Mulaik, 1940 — USA
 C. robusta Simon, 1886 — USA
 C. rosae Gertsch, 1992 — USA
 C. rudimentops Chamberlin & Ivie, 1940 — USA
 C. russelli Gertsch, 1992 — USA
 C. sansaba Gertsch, 1992 — USA
 C. secreta Gertsch, 1992 — USA
 C. selecta Gertsch, 1992 — USA
 C. serena Gertsch, 1992 — USA
 C. shasta Chamberlin & Ivie, 1940 — USA
 C. sheari Gertsch, 1992 — USA
 C. sierra Chamberlin & Ivie, 1940 — USA
 C. simplex Simon, 1886 — USA, Canada
 C. sintonia Gertsch, 1992 — USA
 C. sprousei Gertsch, 1992 — USA
 C. stowersi Gertsch, 1992 — USA
 C. suttoni Gertsch, 1992 — USA
 C. tacoma Chamberlin & Ivie, 1940 — USA
 C. tersa Simon, 1886 — USA, Canada
 C. texana (Gertsch, 1935) — USA
 C. tianmuensis Song & Kim, 1991 — China
 C. tortuba Chamberlin & Ivie, 1940 — USA
 C. travisae Gertsch, 1992 — USA
 C. troglobia Cokendolpher, 2004 — USA
 C. troglodytes Yaginuma, 1972 — Japan
 C. ubicki Gertsch, 1992 — USA
 C. utahana Chamberlin, 1919 — USA
 C. uvalde Gertsch, 1992 — USA
 C. varians Gertsch & Mulaik, 1940 — USA
 C. venefica Gertsch, 1992 — USA
 C. vespera Gertsch, 1992 — USA
 C. vibora Gertsch, 1992 — USA
 C. watersi Gertsch, 1992 — USA
 C. wiltoni Gertsch, 1992 — USA
 C. wusanani Li, 2017 — China
 C. yuelushanensis Wang, Zhou & Peng, 2019 — China
 C. zhazuweii Li, 2017 — China

Cybaeolus

Cybaeolus Simon, 1884
 C. delfini (Simon, 1904) — Chile
 C. pusillus Simon, 1884 (type) — Chile, Argentina
 C. rastellus (Roth, 1967) — Chile

† Cymbiohahnia

† Cymbiohahnia Wunderlich, 2004
 † C. parens Wunderlich, 2004

E

† Eohahnia

† Eohahnia Petrunkevitch, 1958
 † E. succini Petrunkevitch, 1958

H

Hahnia

Hahnia C. L. Koch, 1841
 H. abrahami (Hewitt, 1915) — South Africa
 H. alini Tikader, 1964 — Nepal
 H. arizonica Chamberlin & Ivie, 1942 — USA
 H. banksi Fage, 1938 — Costa Rica, Panama
 H. barbara Denis, 1937 — Algeria
 H. barbata Bosmans, 1992 — Indonesia (Sulawesi)
 H. benoiti Bosmans & Thijs, 1980 — Kenya
 H. biapophysis Huang & Zhang, 2017 — China
 H. breviducta Bosmans & Thijs, 1980 — Kenya
 H. caeca (Georgescu & Sarbu, 1992) — Romania
 H. caelebs Brignoli, 1978 — Bhutan
 H. cameroonensis Bosmans, 1987 — Cameroon
 H. cervicornata Wang & Zhang, 1986 — China
 H. chaoyangensis Zhu & Zhu, 1983 — China
 H. cinerea Emerton, 1890 — North America
 H. clathrata Simon, 1898 — South Africa
 H. corticicola Bösenberg & Strand, 1906 — Russia (East Siberia, Far East), China, Korea, Taiwan, Japan
 H. crozetensis Hickman, 1939 — Crozet Is.
 H. deiocesi Zamani & Marusik, 2021 — Iran
 H. dewittei Bosmans, 1986 — Congo
 H. dongi Huang & Zhang, 2017 — China
 H. eburneensis Jocqué & Bosmans, 1982 — Ivory Coast
 H. eidmanni (Roewer, 1942) — Equatorial Guinea (Bioko)
 H. falcata Wang, 1989 — China
 H. flaviceps Emerton, 1913 — USA
 H. gigantea Bosmans, 1986 — Central Africa
 H. glacialis Sørensen, 1898 — Russia (East Siberia, Far East), Canada, USA, Greenland
 H. harmae Brignoli, 1977 — Tunisia
 H. hauseri Brignoli, 1978 — Spain (Balearic Is.)
 H. helveola Simon, 1875 — Europe, Turkey
 H. heterophthalma Simon, 1905 — Argentina
 H. himalayaensis Hu & Zhang, 1990 — China, Vietnam
 H. implexa Seo, 2017 — Korea
 H. inflata Benoit, 1978 — Kenya
 H. innupta Brignoli, 1978 — Bhutan
 H. insulana Schenkel, 1938 — Madeira
 H. jocquei Bosmans, 1982 — Malawi
 H. laodiana Song, 1990 — China
 H. larseni Marusik, 2017 — South Africa
 H. laticeps Simon, 1898 — South Africa
 H. lehtineni Brignoli, 1978 — Bhutan
 H. leopoldi Bosmans, 1982 — Cameroon
 H. linderi Wunderlich, 1992 — Canary Is.
 H. lobata Bosmans, 1981 — South Africa
 H. maginii Brignoli, 1977 — Italy
 H. major Benoit, 1978 — Kenya
 H. manengoubensis Bosmans, 1987 — Cameroon
 H. martialis Bösenberg & Strand, 1906 — Japan
 H. mauensis Bosmans, 1986 — Kenya
 H. michaelseni Simon, 1902 — Chile, Argentina, Falkland Is.
 H. molossidis Brignoli, 1979 — Greece
 H. montana Seo, 2017 — Korea
 H. mridulae Tikader, 1970 — India
 H. musica Brignoli, 1978 — Bhutan, China
 H. naguaboi (Lehtinen, 1967) — Puerto Rico
 H. nava (Blackwall, 1841) — Europe, Russia (Europe to Far East), Turkey, Israel, Caucasus, Iran, Korea, Japan
 H. ngai Rivera-Quiroz, Petcharad & Miller, 2020 — Thailand
 H. nigricans Benoit, 1978 — Kenya
 H. nobilis Opell & Beatty, 1976 — Mexico
 H. obliquitibialis Bosmans, 1982 — Malawi
 H. okefinokensis Chamberlin & Ivie, 1934 — USA
 H. ononidum Simon, 1875 — USA, Canada, Europe, Turkey, Russia (Europe to Far East), Kazakhstan
 H. oreophila Simon, 1898 — Sri Lanka
 H. ovata Song & Zheng, 1982 — China
 H. petrobia Simon, 1875 — Spain, France, Italy, Germany
 H. pinicola Arita, 1978 — Japan
 H. pusilla C. L. Koch, 1841 (type) — Europe, Russia (Europe to South Siberia)
 H. pusio Simon, 1898 — Sri Lanka
 H. pyriformis Yin & Wang, 1984 — China
 H. quadriseta Galán-Sánchez & Álvarez-Padilla, 2017 — Mexico
 H. rimaformis Zhang, Li & Pham, 2013 — Vietnam
 H. rossii Brignoli, 1977 — Italy, Iran
 H. saccata Zhang, Li & Zheng, 2011 — China, Thailand
 H. sanjuanensis Exline, 1938 — USA, Mexico
 H. schubotzi Strand, 1913 — Central, East Africa
 H. sexoculata Ponomarev, 2009 — Russia (Caucasus)
 H. sibirica Marusik, Hippa & Koponen, 1996 — Russia (Europe to Far East), China
 H. simoni Mello-Leitão, 1919 — Brazil
 H. sirimoni Benoit, 1978 — Kenya
 H. spasskyi Denis, 1958 — Afghanistan
 H. spinata Benoit, 1978 — Kenya
 H. subcorticicola Liu, Huang & Zhang, 2015 — China
 H. submaginii Zhang, Li & Zheng, 2011 — China
 H. subsaccata Huang & Zhang, 2017 — China
 H. tabulicola Simon, 1898 — Africa
 H. tanikawai Suguro, 2015 — Japan
 H. tatei (Gertsch, 1934) — Venezuela
 H. thorntoni Brignoli, 1982 — China, Hong Kong, Laos, Japan
 H. thymorum Emerit & Ledoux, 2014 — France
 H. tikaderi Brignoli, 1978 — Bhutan
 H. tortuosa Song & Kim, 1991 — China
 H. tuybaana Barrion & Litsinger, 1995 — Philippines
 H. ulyxis Brignoli, 1974 — Greece
 H. upembaensis Bosmans, 1986 — Congo
 H. vangoethemi Benoit, 1978 — Kenya
 H. vanwaerebeki Bosmans, 1987 — Cameroon
 H. veracruzana Gertsch & Davis, 1940 — Mexico
 H. wangi Huang & Zhang, 2017 — China
 H. weiningensis Huang, Chen & Zhang, 2018 — China
 H. yakouensis Chen, Yan & Yin, 2009 — China
 H. zhejiangensis Song & Zheng, 1982 — China, Taiwan, Vietnam
 H. zhui Zhang & Chen, 2015 — China
 H. zodarioides (Simon, 1898) — South Africa

Hahniharmia

Hahniharmia Wunderlich, 2004
 H. picta (Kulczyński, 1897) (type) — Europe

Harmiella

Harmiella Brignoli, 1979
 H. schiapelliae Brignoli, 1979 (type) — Brazil

Hexamatia

Hexamatia Rivera-Quiroz, Petcharad & Miller, 2020
 H. seekhaow Rivera-Quiroz, Petcharad & Miller, 2020 (type) — Thailand
 H. senaria (Zhang, Li & Zheng, 2011) — China

I

Iberina

Iberina Simon, 1881
 I. candida (Simon, 1875) — Europe, North Africa, Turkey, Israel
 I. difficilis (Harm, 1966) — France, Italy, Central Europe, Romania
 I. ljovuschkini Pichka, 1965 — Russia (Caucasus)
 I. mazarredoi Simon, 1881 (type) — Spain, France
 I. microphthalma (Snazell & Duffey, 1980) — Britain, Switzerland, Germany, Czechia, Hungary
 I. montana (Blackwall, 1841) — Europe, Turkey

Intihuatana

Intihuatana Lehtinen, 1967
 I. antarctica (Simon, 1902) (type) — Argentina

K

Kapanga

Kapanga Forster, 1970
 K. alta Forster, 1970 — New Zealand
 K. festiva Forster, 1970 — New Zealand
 K. grana Forster, 1970 — New Zealand
 K. hickmani (Forster, 1964) — New Zealand (Auckland Is.)
 K. isulata (Forster, 1970) — New Zealand
 K. luana Forster, 1970 — New Zealand
 K. mana Forster, 1970 — New Zealand
 K. manga Forster, 1970 — New Zealand
 K. solitaria (Bryant, 1935) — New Zealand
 K. wiltoni Forster, 1970 (type) — New Zealand

L

Lizarba

Lizarba Roth, 1967
 L. separata Roth, 1967 (type) — Brazil

M

Mastigusa

Mastigusa Menge, 1854
 M. arietina (Thorell, 1871) — Europe, Iran
 M. lucifuga (Simon, 1898) — France
 M. macrophthalma (Kulczyński, 1897) — Hungary, Balkans, Caucasus?, Russia (Middle and South Siberia)?

N

Neoantistea

Neoantistea Gertsch, 1934
 N. agilis (Keyserling, 1887) (type) — USA, Canada
 N. alachua Gertsch, 1946 — USA
 N. aspembira Galán-Sánchez & Álvarez-Padilla, 2017 — Mexico
 N. caporiaccoi Brignoli, 1976 — Kashmir
 N. coconino Chamberlin & Ivie, 1942 — USA
 N. crandalli Gertsch, 1946 — USA
 N. gosiuta Gertsch, 1934 — USA
 N. hidalgoensis Opell & Beatty, 1976 — Mexico
 N. inaffecta Opell & Beatty, 1976 — Mexico
 N. jacalana Gertsch, 1946 — Mexico
 N. janetscheki Brignoli, 1976 — Nepal
 N. kaisaisa Barrion & Litsinger, 1995 — Philippines
 N. lyrica Opell & Beatty, 1976 — Mexico to Costa Rica
 N. magna (Keyserling, 1887) — USA, Canada
 N. maxima (Caporiacco, 1935) — Kashmir
 N. mulaiki Gertsch, 1946 — USA, Mexico
 N. multidentata Galán-Sánchez & Álvarez-Padilla, 2017 — Mexico
 N. oklahomensis Opell & Beatty, 1976 — USA
 N. procteri Gertsch, 1946 — USA
 N. pueblensis Opell & Beatty, 1976 — Mexico
 N. quelpartensis Paik, 1958 — Russia (Far East), China, Korea, Japan
 N. riparia (Keyserling, 1887) — USA
 N. santana Chamberlin & Ivie, 1942 — USA
 N. spica Opell & Beatty, 1976 — Mexico
 N. unifistula Opell & Beatty, 1976 — Mexico

Neoaviola

Neoaviola Butler, 1929
 N. insolens Butler, 1929 (type) — Australia (Victoria)

Neohahnia

Neohahnia Mello-Leitão, 1917
 N. chibcha Heimer & Müller, 1988 — Colombia
 N. ernsti (Simon, 1898) — St. Vincent, Venezuela
 N. palmicola Mello-Leitão, 1917 — Brazil
 N. sylviae Mello-Leitão, 1917 (type) — Brazil

P

Pacifantistea

Pacifantistea Marusik, 2011
 P. ovtchinnikovi Marusik, 2011 (type) — Russia, Japan

Porioides

Porioides Forster, 1989
 P. rima (Forster, 1970) (type) — New Zealand
 P. tasmani (Forster, 1970) — New Zealand

† Protohahnia

† Protohahnia Wunderlich, 2004
 † P. antiqua Wunderlich, 2004 
 † P. tripartita Wunderlich, 2004

R

Rinawa

Rinawa Forster, 1970
 R. bola Forster, 1970 — New Zealand
 R. cantuaria Forster, 1970 — New Zealand
 R. otagoensis Forster, 1970 (type) — New Zealand
 R. pula Forster, 1970 — New Zealand

S

Scotospilus

Scotospilus Simon, 1886
 S. ampullarius (Hickman, 1948) — Australia (Tasmania)
 S. bicolor Simon, 1886 (type) — Australia (Tasmania)
 S. divisus (Forster, 1970) — New Zealand
 S. longus Zhang, Li & Pham, 2013 — Vietnam
 S. maindroni (Simon, 1906) — India
 S. nelsonensis (Forster, 1970) — New Zealand
 S. plenus (Forster, 1970) — New Zealand
 S. wellingtoni (Hickman, 1948) — Australia (Tasmania)
 S. westlandicus (Forster, 1970) — New Zealand

References

Hahniidae